Lampton is a small area of Hounslow located on the Great West Road in the London Borough of Hounslow, between Hounslow town centre and Heston. Its name derives from the Old English for 'lamb farm.'

Lampton was traditionally the property of the Bulstrodes (lords of the manor of Hounslow) from the 18th century on; their plans to create grand housing along the Lampton Road in 1881 were unsuccessful, and the area remained a small, primarily-agricultural hamlet until the late 19th century. The area became built-up as a result of the extension of what is now the Piccadilly line to Hounslow.

The area gives its name to Lampton School, Lampton Road and Lampton Park.

References

Areas of London
Districts of the London Borough of Hounslow
Places formerly in Middlesex